Marco Padalino (born 8 December 1983) is a Swiss former professional footballer who played as a midfielder. He played for Malcantone Agno, Catania, Piacenza, Sampdoria and Vicenza, and Lugano. A Swiss international from 2009 to 2014, he represented Switzerland at the 2010 and 2014 FIFA World Cups. Originally an attacking midfielder, he played as a winger in his later career.

Personal life
Padalino was born in Switzerland and is of Italian descent.

References

External links

Living people
1983 births
Sportspeople from Lugano
Association football midfielders
Association football wingers
Swiss men's footballers
Switzerland international footballers
Switzerland youth international footballers
Swiss people of Italian descent
Swiss expatriate footballers
Swiss expatriate sportspeople in Italy
FC Lugano players
Catania S.S.D. players
Piacenza Calcio 1919 players
U.C. Sampdoria players
L.R. Vicenza players
Serie A players
Serie B players
Swiss Challenge League players
Expatriate footballers in Italy
2010 FIFA World Cup players